Veterans of Disorder is a studio album by the American band Royal Trux. It was released in 1999 by Drag City.

Critical reception
The Washington Post wrote that the album "starts with straightforward rockers like the ones the band recorded for its two Virgin albums ... But after the Latin-influenced '!Yo Se!', the music veers in the looser, jazzier direction of the band's earlier work." NME named it the 27th best album of 1999.

Record Collector called Veterans of Disorder "by no means a classic album but, as a statement against conformity, convention and expectation, it still packs a powerful punch."

Track listing

References

External links
 

1999 albums
Royal Trux albums
Drag City (record label) albums
Domino Recording Company albums